Ambulyx pryeri is a moth of the family Sphingidae first described by William Lucas Distant in 1887. It is found in Sundaland.Also found in Nepal.

Gallery

Biology 
Larvae have been recorded on Plumeria species.

Subspecies
Ambulyx pryeri pryeri (Thailand, Malaysia, Borneo, Sumatra, Java, the Philippines)
Ambulyx pryeri tenggarensis Brechlin, 2009 (Flores)

References

External links
"Ambulyx pryeri Distant, 1887". The Sphingidae of Southeast-Asia. Archived July 7, 2011.

Ambulyx
Moths described in 1887
Moths of Asia